"Invisible Man" is the debut single by American boy band 98 Degrees, released on June 24, 1997 as the first single from their debut album 98 Degrees (1997). It was their breakthrough hit, peaking at number 12 on the US Billboard Hot 100. The song is featured as a bonus track on the European version of 98 Degrees and Rising. An acoustic version of the song is the closing track on their 2013 studio album 2.0.

Music video
Two music videos were made for the song. The more popular was shot in colors featuring the 98 Degrees members in a party with people dancing, some scenes show the members sitting on a couch while singing and some alternate shots featuring each member on what appears to be an apartment footbridge. The first was shot in black and white with the members getting out of a car and then walks to an empty warehouse and they start singing. The video was released on June 16, 2009. As of 11 October 2018, the video has received over 5 million views.

Track listing
US single
"Invisible Man" (LP Version) – 4:41 (Kipner, DeViller, Hosein)
"Invisible Man" (Instrumental) – 4:42 (Kipner, DeViller, Hosein)

12" vinyl, maxi-single
A1. "Invisible Man" (Soul Solution club mix) – 5:20 	
A2. "Invisible Man" (Soul Solution dub mix) – 3:46 	
B1. "Invisible Man" (Soul Solution instrumental mix) – 5:21 	
B2. "Invisible Man" [Soul Solution radio edit) – 2:50 	
B3. "Invisible Man" [Soul Solution a cappella mix) – 3:01

UK single
"Invisible Man" (Radio Edit) – 3:53
"Invisible Man" (LP Version) – 4:41

UK maxi-CD
"Invisible Man" (Radio Edit) – 3:53
"Invisible Man" (LP Version) – 4:41
"Invisible Man" (Instrumental) – 4:42
"Invisible Man" (A Cappella) – 4:26

Charts

Weekly charts

Year-end charts

Certifications

References

1997 debut singles
98 Degrees songs
Pop ballads
Contemporary R&B ballads
Songs written by Steve Kipner
1997 songs
Songs written by Dane Deviller
Universal Motown Records singles
Songs written by Sean Hosein
Motown singles
Black-and-white music videos